Georgina Rose Chapman (born 14 April 1976) is an English fashion designer and actress. She was a regular cast member on Project Runway All Stars and, together with Keren Craig, is a co-founder of the fashion label Marchesa. Chapman was married to film producer Harvey Weinstein before leaving him in 2017 in the wake of allegations of sexual abuse against him.

Life and career 
Chapman was born in London, England, the daughter of Caroline Wonfor, a journalist, and Brian Chapman, a co-owner of the coffee company Percol. Chapman grew up in Richmond, southwest London. Chapman attended Marlborough College in Wiltshire. In her 20s, Chapman modelled in an advertisement for Head & Shoulders, a dandruff shampoo, and one for throat lozenges Soothers. Chapman met future business partner Keren Craig while they were students at Chelsea College of Art and Design. Chapman graduated from Wimbledon School of Art in 2001 and began her career as a costume designer. After graduation, Chapman appeared in various television shows and films.

In 2004, she and Craig launched Marchesa, named after socialite Marchesa Luisa Casati. Investors include Giuseppe Cipriani and Steve Witkoff. In 2006, the label was named one of the CFDA/Vogue Fashion Fund's top 10 finalists. According to the 2015 Sunday Times Rich List, Chapman has a net worth of £15 million. From 2012 to 2019, Chapman was a judge on the Weinstein-produced TV show Project Runway: All Stars.

In May 2019, Chapman's design for an evening gown was featured in the 2019 Met Gala in New York as worn by Hollywood actress Constance Wu on the runway and staircase for the event.

Personal life 
Chapman was born with femoral anteversion, commonly known as being 'pigeon-toed', as the condition causes her toes to point inward while walking. At the age of eight, she was also diagnosed with dyslexia. She is good friends with actor David Oyelowo, whom she has known since she was 18.

Chapman and film producer Harvey Weinstein began dating in 2004, prior to his separation from his first wife and married on 15 December 2007 in Connecticut, US. They have two children. On 10 October 2017, Chapman announced she was divorcing Weinstein after more than 100 women made accusations of rape, assault, or sexual harassment against him. They reached a settlement in January 2018 and their divorce was finalised in July 2021.

In March 2020, it was reported that she was in a relationship with actor Adrien Brody.

Filmography 
 Desire (2001) as Eve
 Jeffrey Archer: The Truth (2002) (TV) as secretary
 Shanghai Knights (2003) as debutante
 Sons & Lovers (2003) (TV) as Louie
 Rosemary & Thyme as Celia Llewellyn (1 episode, 2004)
 Bride & Prejudice (2004) as Anne
 A Soldier's Tunic (2004) as Katherine Cranborn
 Piccadilly Jim (2004) as Connie 1
 Derailed (2005) as Candy
 The Business (2005) as Carly
 Match Point (2005) as Nola co-worker
 Danny the Dog (2005) as floozy 1
 Zemanovaload (2005) as Jenna
 Factory Girl (2006) as interviewer
 Project Catwalk (2006) TV Series as herself, guest panelist on season 1, episode 9
 Awake (2007) as Penny Carver Elliot 
 The Nanny Diaries (2007) as TriBeCa fashionista
 Don't – Fake Trailer in between Planet Terror and Death Proof in Grindhouse (2007)
 Gossip Girl (2009) as herself
 Project Runway: All Stars (2012–2019) as judge

References

External links
 
 
 Telegraph Fashion interview: Georgina Chapman: designer to the stars
 Harper's Bazaar interview: Chapman's Style Secrets

1976 births
Living people
English fashion designers
English businesspeople in fashion
English female models
English film actresses
English television actresses
21st-century English businesswomen
21st-century English businesspeople
Wedding dress designers
Actresses from London
Actresses from Los Angeles
Businesspeople from London
Alumni of Chelsea College of Arts
Alumni of Wimbledon College of Arts
English expatriates in the United States
Participants in American reality television series
21st-century English actresses
Actors with dyslexia
People from Greenwich Village
People from Westport, Connecticut
British women fashion designers